The striped marsh frog or brown-striped frog (Limnodynastes peronii) is a predominantly aquatic frog native to coastal Eastern Australia. It is a common species in urban habitats.

Taxonomy
The striped marsh frog was described by French naturalists André Marie Constant Duméril and Gabriel Bibron in 1841.

Description
They are a shade of brown on the dorsal surface. This colour can be light or dark; they can also be a red-brown on the dorsal surface. There are distinct darker stripes running down the frogs back (giving this species its name), there is normally a paler mid-dorsal stripe running down the back. There is a black "mask" that runs from the nostril, through the eye and down to the shoulder. This "mask" is followed by a thick light golden line that runs underneath the "mask" and terminates at the end of the mouth. Breeding males develop thick arms, these are used in "wrestling" matches with other frogs, the throat of males is yellow in colour. The belly is white.

Distribution and habitat
It is distributed from the southern parts of the Cape York Peninsula in North Queensland, through all of coastal New South Wales, Southern Victoria to southeastern South Australia and Northern Tasmania. Although this species is very common in coastal NSW, it is not common in Tasmania and listed as rare.

Ecology and behaviour

This species is the most frequently encountered frog on the east coast of Australia. They are normally the first frog to colonise a garden frog pond and are often victims of backyard swimming pools. They will inhabit ponds, roadside ditches, creeks, dams, flooded areas and any other available water body. The natural prey of this species includes another local species of frog called Bibron's Toadlet.  They are tolerant of polluted water. Males call while floating in water from a hidden area in vegetation. They make a "knock" call as if you were to hit a piece of timber with a hammer,  during all months of the year (particularly spring-autumn). This call is familiar to anyone in Sydney who has a garden pond.

Several studies have used striped marsh frogs to try to understand why worldwide amphibian declines are greater in montane regions. Researchers have found that negative effects of low temperatures and high ultraviolet-B (UVB) radiation on tadpole survival are greater when the two stressors are combined. UVB radiation decreased the survival of striped marsh frog tadpoles, but there was an increasingly large mortality rate when low temperatures were involved. UVB radiation caused DNA damage, and as the temperature decreased, the turnover time to repair DNA decreased, so the damage lasted longer.

The breeding season is from late winter to early spring. Eggs are laid in a foamy nest and tadpoles can take 8–12 months to develop. Pale brown, they can be up to 6.5 cm long.

Human interactions
In Australia this animal may be kept in captivity with the appropriate permit.  However, striped marsh frogs also often colonise garden ponds.

Sources
Anstis, M. 2002. Tadpoles of South-eastern Australia. Reed New Holland: Sydney.
Robinson, M. 2002. A Field Guide to Frogs of Australia. Australian Museum/Reed New Holland: Sydney.
 
Frogs of Australia
Frog and Tadpole Study Group
Department of Environment, Climate Change and Water, New South Wales: Amphibian Keeper's Licence: Species Lists
Wildlife Victoria,keeping-and-trading-wildlife/private-wildlife-licences

References

  Database entry includes a range map and justification for why this species is of least concern

Limnodynastes
Amphibians of Queensland
Amphibians of New South Wales
Amphibians of the Australian Capital Territory
Amphibians of Victoria (Australia)
Amphibians of South Australia
Amphibians of Tasmania
Amphibians described in 1841
Taxa named by André Marie Constant Duméril
Taxa named by Gabriel Bibron
Frogs of Australia